The Sfax Indoor Sports Complex is an indoor sporting arena located in Sfax, Tunisia.  The capacity of the arena is 4,000 spectators.

Events

The Sports Indoor Complex is used for many Sports disciplines like Volleyball, Basketball, Handball and also the arena hold many politics and cultural Events.

See also
CS Sfaxien

References

Indoor arenas in Tunisia